The Governor of Ceylon can refer to historical vice-regal representatives of three colonial powers:

Portuguese Ceylon
 List of Captains of Portuguese Ceylon (1518–1551)
 List of Captain-majors of Portuguese Ceylon (1551–1594)
 List of Governors of Portuguese Ceylon (1594–1658)

Dutch Ceylon
 List of Dutch Governors of Ceylon (1640–1796)

British Ceylon
 Governors of British Ceylon (1798–1948)

Dominion of Ceylon
 Governor-General of Ceylon (1948–1972)

Political history of Sri Lanka
1518 establishments in Asia
16th-century establishments in Sri Lanka
1658 disestablishments in Asia
17th-century disestablishments in Sri Lanka
1640 establishments in Asia
17th-century establishments in Sri Lanka
1796 disestablishments in Asia
18th-century disestablishments in Sri Lanka
1798 establishments in Asia
18th-century establishments in Sri Lanka
1972 disestablishments in Sri Lanka